The Magai is a small river of Eastern Uttar Pradesh, India. This rivers enters Ghazipur district in the north of Shadiabad and joins the Tamsa river in ballia district and Tamsa river eventually meets the Ganges near ballia district.

The Magai river touch Villages like Hata, Silaich, Karimuddinpur, Nasrat Pur etc

It is famous for its pan (betel) leaves.

Meet Tamsa river Near Bhikharipur.

Originate in Ghazipur Uttar Pradesh.

It connects many small village such as Hata (mohammadabad), madhuban and malikpura.

Rivers of Uttar Pradesh
Ghazipur district
Rivers of India